Louis Alexandre Chiron (3 August 1899 – 22 June 1979) was a Monégasque racing driver who competed in rallies, sports car races, and Grands Prix.

Among the greatest drivers between the two World Wars, his career embraced over thirty years, starting in 1927, and ending at the end of the 1950s. He is still the oldest driver ever to have finished in Formula One, having taken 6th place in the 1955 Monaco Grand Prix when he was 55. The Bugatti Chiron takes its name from him.

Career
Louis Chiron gained interest in cars and racing when he was a teenager. He started driving in Grand Prix races after World War I, in which he was seconded from an artillery regiment as a driver for Maréchal Pétain and Maréchal Foch.

He won his first local race, the Grand Prix du Comminges of 1926, at Saint-Gaudens, near Toulouse, and went on to drive a Bugatti and an Alfa Romeo P3 to victories in the Marseille Grand Prix, the Circuit of Masaryk, and the Spanish Grand Prix. In the Indianapolis 500 of 1929, he drove a Delage to 7th place. He won the 1931 Monaco Grand Prix—the only Monégasque driver to have won his home grand prix—and in 1933 he partnered with specialist endurance racer Luigi Chinetti to win the Spa 24 hours race.

Chiron retired in 1938, and World War II curtailed motor racing a year later. When racing resumed after the War, he came out of retirement and drove a Talbot-Lago to victory in two French Grands Prix.

According to a Los Angeles Times review of fellow driver Hellé Nice's biography, Chiron accused her, at a 1949 party in Monaco to celebrate the first postwar Monte Carlo Rally, of "collaborating with the Nazis". The review says biographer Miranda Seymour is "circumspect on Nice's guilt". A review of the same book in The New York Times says Nice was accused of being a "Gestapo agent"; that Seymour "rebuts" the charge; and that it made Nice "unemployable". Seymour's book says that in a letter to Antony Noghes, the head of the Monte Carlo Rally committee, Hellé Nice "protested her innocence"; that she told him she would appeal to the Monaco court unless Chiron wrote an apology; that no letter from Chiron has been found; and that the court has no record of such a case between 1949 and 1955.

Paired with the Swiss driver Ciro Basadonna, Chiron won the 1954 Monte Carlo Rally, and achieved podium finishes in the fifteen Formula One races he entered that year. His last race was in 1955, when he took a Lancia D50 to sixth place in the Monaco Grand Prix a few weeks before his 56th birthday, becoming the oldest driver to compete in a Formula One race. He is also the oldest driver ever to have entered for a Formula One race, taking part in practice for the 1958 Monaco Grand Prix when he was 58.

Racing record

Major career victories

Belgian Grand Prix – 1930
Czechoslovakian Grand Prix – 1931, 1932, 1933
French Grand Prix – 1931, 1934, 1937, 1947, 1949 (Reims)
German Grand Prix – 1929
Italian Grand Prix – 1928
Spanish Grand Prix – 1928, 1929, 1933
Monaco Grand Prix – 1931
Moroccan Grand Prix– 1934
Grand Prix du Comminges – 1947
Grand Prix de Marseilles – 1933
Grand Prix de Nice – 1932
Spa 24 hours – 1933
Rome Grand Prix – 1928
Marne Grand Prix – 1928
Monte Carlo Rally – 1954

24 Hours of Le Mans results

Complete European Championship results
(key) (Races in bold indicate pole position; races in italics indicate fastest lap.)

Post-WWII Grandes Épreuves results
(key) (Races in bold indicate pole position; races in italics indicate fastest lap.)

Complete Formula One World Championship results
(key)

Legacy
Chiron retired after 35 years in racing  but maintained an executive role with the organizers of the Monaco Grand Prix, who honoured him with a statue on the Grand Prix course and renamed the Swimming Pool corner after him. As he had achieved the greatest number of podium finishes in Bugattis, the 1999 Bugatti 18/3 Chiron concept car and the 2016 Bugatti Chiron are named in his honour.

Louis Chiron was so popular in Czechoslovakia, whose Grand Prix he won three consecutive times, that even after 75 years his name still lives in a popular saying "He drives like Chiron", used mainly when referring to speeding motorists or generally to people who drive very quickly.

Chiron was the only Monegasque driver to score points in a Formula One race until Charles Leclerc in the 2018 Azerbaijan Grand Prix and the only Monegasque to score a podium until Leclerc in the 2019 Bahrain Grand Prix.

See also
 Formula One drivers from Monaco

References

External links

 Grand Prix History , Louis Chiron
 Louis Chiron at The Crittenden Automotive Library 
 
 

1899 births
1979 deaths
Bugatti people
Indianapolis 500 drivers
24 Hours of Le Mans drivers
24 Hours of Spa drivers
Monegasque racing drivers
Monegasque Formula One drivers
French military personnel of World War I
Maserati Formula One drivers
Enrico Platé Formula One drivers
Ecurie Rosier Formula One drivers
Lancia Formula One drivers
Scuderia Centro Sud Formula One drivers
Monegasque rally drivers
Grand Prix drivers
World Sportscar Championship drivers
European Championship drivers
Carrera Panamericana drivers
People from Monte Carlo